The Newport Chemical Depot, previously known as the Wabash River Ordnance Works and the Newport Army Ammunition Plant, was a  bulk chemical storage and destruction facility that was operated by the United States Army. It is located near Newport, in west central Indiana, thirty-two miles north of Terre Haute. The site was used as a production site for the solid explosives trinitrotoluene and RDX, as well as for heavy water. It also served as the production site for all of the U.S. military's nerve agent VX, when it was in use. All VX nerve agent at the site was neutralized by August 8, 2008. It was the third of the Army's nine chemical depots to completely destroy its stockpile.

History

Wabash River Ordnance Works
Newport was founded during World War II to produce the military high explosive RDX. It was built during 1942–1943 by the E.I. Dupont de Nemours & Co., the original operating contractor of the site, and was originally known as the Wabash River Ordnance Works.

Given the immediate need for RDX, the plant was designed to employ the older Woolwich method for manufacturing the explosive. As a result, the plant manufactured lower amounts of RDX compared to the Holston Ordnance Works, which used the more updated Bachmann process.

The government originally acquired  to build the plant. Although most of the land was used for farming, there were 66 clusters of buildings, six cemeteries, and one church. The cemeteries, one apparently dating to 1810, were still maintained as of 1998. Construction started January 12, 1942, and production started July 20, 1942.

The plant was mothballed in 1946, but its RDX production was reactivated in 1951 for the Korean War.

Heavy water plant
In 1943–1944, the Newport Army Ammunition Plant added a heavy water plant as an element of the Manhattan Project's P-9 Project for construction of nuclear weapons. During the 1950s, it was used to produce heavy water for the U.S. nuclear weapons program.

Production and stockpiling of chemical weapons
The Army first built a VX facility at the site in 1959 when it was known as the Newport Chemical Plant. In 1964, the Wabash River Ordnance Works and the Newport Army Chemical Plant were effectively combined and renamed the Newport Army Ammunition Plant.

Beginning in 1961, Newport became a site for chemical weapons manufacturing, producing the entire U.S. stockpile of VX nerve agent at the time. It was also used to store and eventually neutralize  of the agent when the U.S. chemical weapons program was shut down. The stored VX amounted to 4.1% of the U.S. stockpile of chemical weapons in 1997 when the Chemical Weapons Convention came into effect.

Chemical weapons disposal

The U.S. Army Chemical Materials Agency designed the Newport Chemical Agent Disposal Facility (NECDF) for the sole purpose of destroying the VX chemical agent stored at the Newport Chemical Depot. Construction of the NECDF was completed in June 2003. The Army began VX agent destruction operations in May 2005, and completed operations in August 2008. Destruction was performed on behalf of the U.S. Army Chemical Materials Agency by Parsons Infrastructure & Technology, Inc. and more than 500 civilian employees worked at the facility. NECDF's permit was officially closed in January 2010. The site was the largest employer in Vermillion County between 1941 and its closing, having employed 1,000 workers at its peak.

Process
The Army employed neutralization for the destruction of the VX chemical agent. The agent was neutralized in steel reactors by thoroughly mixing it with heated sodium hydroxide and water. Control room operators directed and monitored the entire process remotely, using a state-of-the-art control system. Once agent neutralization was verified at the on-site laboratory, the caustic wastewater was placed into on-site intermodal storage containers awaiting transport for final treatment to Veolia Environmental Services in Port Arthur, Texas. This process is a different method than incineration which has been the primary manner of chemical agent destruction at other installations.

Delays
The start of operations was delayed several years due to problems in the arrangements of the disposal of the wastewater, which was anticipated to contains trace amounts of VX and 4 byproducts (less than 20 parts per million), problems that had not been completely solved at the start of destruction. Permafix and DuPont did not accept the wastewater for treatment, so it was stored on-site until the Army found another disposal option. Waste was eventually shipped to Port Arthur, Texas where it was processed and incinerated by the company Veolia Environmental Services. A lawsuit delayed the implementation of the shipments, but the suit was ultimately dismissed by a federal judge. The Organisation for the Prohibition of Chemical Weapons certified that the stockpile was 100 percent destroyed in September 2009.

Incidents
A few incidents have occurred during the destruction process, including a 30-gallon spill of VX during processing on June 10, 2005. Further incidents involved spills of the hydrolysate end product. None of these incidents resulted in any injuries.

Base closure and redevelopment
A 2005 BRAC commission report recommended the depot's closure and the Army held a Deactivation Ceremony in June 2010, signifying that all activities required for closure of the NECD had been successfully completed. In preparation for closure, the Newport Chemical Depot Reuse Authority (NeCDRA) was created to complete a reuse master plan for the NECD. NeCDRA and its consultant team worked with the local community to create a plan and implementation strategy for the conversion of the depot to civilian use. NECD's closure led to the loss of over 675 jobs and rural Vermillion County's largest employer.

NeCDRA sought a civilian reuse plan that would replace lost jobs, maintain environmental quality, and be economically viable and obtained partnerships with Duke Energy and Garmong Construction. The depot has since been transformed into Vermillion Rise Mega Park, a 7,100-acre office and industrial park also containing a 2,806-acre habitat for the endangered Indiana bat. As of October 2020, the park hosted six companies and 130 jobs in addition to leasing land for agricultural purposes, supporting related industries. Additionally, NeCDRA has also obtained local infrastructure improvements, such as a $2.4 million waterline project, a $3 million shell building project, and a $12 million 230-69 kV electrical substation.

Timeline of VX production, storage, and destruction

See also

 United States and weapons of mass destruction

References

Works cited

Further reading

External links

Closed installations of the United States Army
Historic American Engineering Record in Indiana
United States chemical weapons depots
Buildings and structures in Vermillion County, Indiana
Military installations in Indiana
Chemical weapons destruction facilities
1942 establishments in Indiana